Search for Beauty is a 1934 pre-Code dramedy film, with some musical Busby Berkeley-esque athletic sequences, directed by Erle C. Kenton and starring Buster Crabbe and Ida Lupino (the film was released shortly before Lupino's 16th birthday). They play a pair of lovers and aquatic champion Olympians (he a swimmer, she a diver) who become the face of a health magazine, which over their objections is turned into a "skin" rag. Armstrong and Michael portray ex-cons with the 'scheme' (and both have designs to break up the loving couple for themselves), and Gleason is their cohort. In his first few scenes Crabbe promotes exercise: "Get off your (pause) 'feet' and get on them!"

Cast

Buster Crabbe as Don Jackson
Ida Lupino as Barbara Hilton
Robert Armstrong as Larry Williams
James Gleason as Dan Healy, the 'publisher'
Toby Wing as Sally Palmer, Barbara's cousin
Gertrude Michael as Jean Strange
Bradley Page as Joe Garrett
Frank McGlynn, Sr. as Rev. Rankin
Nora Cecil as Miss Pettigrew
Virginia Hammond as Mrs. Archibald Henderson-James 
Eddie Gribbon as Adolph Knockler 
James B. 'Pop' Kenton as Caretaker
Lynn Bari as Beauty Contest Entrant (uncredited)
Maurice Costello as Health Acres Guest (uncredited)
Joyzelle Joyner as Beauty Contest Entrant (uncredited)
Ann Sheridan as Texas Beauty Winner (uncredited)

Notes
The magazine publishing company shown in the film has been interpreted as a parody of the publishing enterprises owned by Bernarr Macfadden at the time.

References

Sources
Doherty, Thomas Patrick. Pre-Code Hollywood: Sex, Immorality, and Insurrection in American Cinema 1930-1934. New York: Columbia University Press 1999.

External links

1934 films
1934 comedy-drama films
American comedy-drama films
Films directed by Erle C. Kenton
American black-and-white films
1930s American films